Leif Johansson (born 9 February 1950) is a Swedish bobsledder. He competed in the four man event at the 1976 Winter Olympics.

References

1950 births
Living people
Swedish male bobsledders
Olympic bobsledders of Sweden
Bobsledders at the 1976 Winter Olympics
Place of birth missing (living people)
20th-century Swedish people